Croton texensis (common names Texas croton, goat weed, skunk weed, and doveweed), is a plant found in the United States.

Uses
Among the Zuni people, a decoction of the plant is taken for "sick stomach", as a purgative, and as a diuretic. An infusion is also taken for stomachaches, for syphilis, and for gonorrhea. The fresh or dried root is chewed by a medicine man before sucking snakebite and a poultice is applied to the wound. The whole plant can be placed under the mattress or burned to repel bedbugs.

References

External links

texensis
Flora of the United States
Plants used in traditional Native American medicine
Plants described in 1841